The 2010 NHL Winter Classic (known via corporate sponsorship as the 2010 NHL Winter Classic presented by Bridgestone) was an outdoor ice hockey game played in the National Hockey League (NHL) on January 1, 2010, at Fenway Park in Boston, Massachusetts. The third edition of the Winter Classic, it matched the Boston Bruins (the home team) against the Philadelphia Flyers. The Bruins won the game, 2–1, in overtime. With the victory, the Bruins became the first home team to win a Winter Classic. After the game, the roster of the United States men's hockey team for the 2010 Winter Olympics was released, which included Bruins' goaltender Tim Thomas.

The New York Rangers had previously also been considered as an opponent for the Bruins. The game was telecast on NBC in the United States; in Canada, CBC televised the game in English, and RDS held the French language rights, while ESPN America televised the contest in Europe. Radio rights nationally were held by Sirius XM Radio, while WBZ-FM in Boston and WIP in Philadelphia used their local announcers. Additionally, there was pre-and-post game coverage on the NHL Network in the USA and Canada. The game garnered a 2.6 national rating and 3.7 million viewers, down slightly from the 2009 Classic. In Boston, the game captured a 14.4 rating and a 29 share.

Since there was no NHL All-Star Game in the 2009–10 season due to the 2010 Winter Olympics, which were held in Vancouver, in February, the Winter Classic served as the league's biggest showcase game of the season. The NHL was in negotiations with the Calgary Flames to host a second outdoor game on New Year's Day at McMahon Stadium, likely against another Canadian opponent. That game was instead played in February 2011.

Site selection
Early reports indicated six possible venues for the 2010 game: the Las Vegas Strip, Yankee Stadium, the Rose Bowl, either Nationals Park or Robert F. Kennedy Stadium in Washington, D.C., Comerica Park in Detroit and Fenway Park. The Rose Bowl stadium was eliminated as they host the Rose Bowl Game and the 2010 BCS National Championship Game. NHL Commissioner Gary Bettman visited Yankee Stadium on February 12, 2009, to take a tour of the new facility with New York Yankees owner George Steinbrenner and New York mayor Michael Bloomberg, where the trio discussed the possibility of having the game in the Bronx.

Uniforms
For this game, the Flyers wore a reverse of their current home uniform, a white replica of their 1973–74 home jersey, but with a black nameplate with white lettering. The Bruins wore a uniform designed by former great Cam Neely in dark yellow with brown pants with dark yellow socks with brown and white striping and a different "B" in their famous "Hub" logo introduced in 1948–49 on their 1955–57 uniforms; brown and gold were the Bruins' colors when they entered the NHL for its 1924–25 regular season.  Both jerseys are on Reebok's NHL Edge Uniform template.

Pre-game

The ceremonial faceoff was conducted between Hall of Fame members representing the respective teams: Bobby Orr for Boston and Philadelphia's Bobby Clarke. The national anthems were performed by Daniel Powter ("O Canada") and James Taylor ("The Star-Spangled Banner").

Prior to the entrance of the players, pre-game entertainment was provided by Celtic punk band the Dropkick Murphys, performing "I'm Shipping Up to Boston."

Game summary

During the scoreless first period, the first fight in a Winter Classic occurred as Shawn Thornton and Daniel Carcillo engaged each other, with Carcillo getting the takedown. At 4:42 in the second period, Danny Syvret scored his first career NHL goal with a shot from the blueline as the distracted Bruins goaltender Tim Thomas shoved Philadelphia's Scott Hartnell from his front. Over the course of the game, especially toward the end of each period, the ice became noticeably choppy, resulting in several odd man rushes. After Kimmo Timonen took a tripping penalty on Zdeno Chara, the Bruins tied the game on the powerplay with Mark Recchi tipping in a Derek Morris slap-pass with 2:18 left in the game. During overtime, Bruins goaltender Tim Thomas made a flurry of huge saves to keep the Bruins in the game, including stopping a 2 on 1 against Daniel Briere and Mike Richards. On the Bruins' following counter-attack up the ice, Marco Sturm tipped a Patrice Bergeron pass past Flyers goaltender Michael Leighton to win the game.

Number in parenthesis represents the player's total in goals or assists to that point of the season

Team rosters

 Tuukka Rask dressed for the Boston Bruins as the back-up goalie and did not enter the game.   Brian Boucher dressed for the Philadelphia Flyers as the back-up goalie and did not enter the game.

Scratches
Philadelphia Flyers: Riley Cote, Ryan Parent, Mika Pyorala
Boston Bruins: Adam McQuaid

Officials
 Referees — Kerry Fraser, Chris Rooney
 Linesmen — Lyle Seitz, Brian Murphy

Aftermath
Four months later, the Flyers and Bruins would meet in the Stanley Cup playoffs, marking the second-straight year that the two teams that faced each other in the Winter Classic met in the postseason. The Flyers defeated the Bruins in dramatic fashion rallying from a 3–0 deficit to win the series, becoming the third team in NHL history and the fourth in pro sports history to accomplish this feat. The other three teams to rally from a 3–0 deficit to win a playoff series were the Toronto Maple Leafs in 1942, the New York Islanders in 1975 and the Boston Red Sox in 2004. The Flyers capped off the series comeback by also overcoming a 3–0 deficit in Game 7. The Flyers would eventually advance to the Stanley Cup Final but lost in six games to the Chicago Blackhawks. A year later, those two teams meet in the 2011 Stanley Cup Playoffs and the Bruins swept the Flyers and eventually advanced to the Stanley Cup Final and won in seven games over the Vancouver Canucks.

Entertainment
Prior to the game, there was a performance by a colonial marching band. Afterwards, Dropkick Murphys performed their hit song, "I'm Shipping Up To Boston".

See also
2009–10 Boston Bruins season
2009–10 Philadelphia Flyers season
List of outdoor ice hockey games
List of ice hockey games with highest attendance

References

External links
Game boxscore

NHL Winter Classic
Winter Classic
NHL Winter Classic
NHL Winter Classic
2009
2009
Ice hockey competitions in Boston
NHL Winter Classic